Doggone may refer to:
 Doggone Cats, a 1947-released Warner Bros. cartoon in the Merrie Melodies series
 "Doggone Crazy", an episode of the animated television series King Of The Hill
 "Doggone Right", a 1969 single recorded by Smokey Robinson & The Miracles
 Doggone Sauce, a gourmet hot sauce company created to donate proceeds to Animal Shelters and Humane Societies
 "I'll Be Doggone", a 1965 song recorded by American soul singer Marvin Gaye
 "So Doggone Lonesome", a song written by country singer Johnny Cash

See also
 Dogon (disambiguation)